Viktor Vladimirovich Vasin (born 6 October 1988) is a Russian professional footballer who plays as a centre-back for Kairat.

Career

Club
On 26 April 2019, Vasin signed a new contract with CSKA Moscow, keeping him at the club until the summer of 2021.

On 22 February 2022, Vasin signed for FC Kairat on a contract until the end of 2022.

International
He was called up for the Russia national football team for the friendly game against Belgium on 17 November 2010 and made his debut in that game.

Career statistics

Club

International

As of match played 14 November 2017.

International goalsScores and results list Russia's goal tally first.''

Honours
CSKA Moscow
Russian Premier League (2): 2012–13, 2013–14
Russian Cup (1): 2012–13
Russian Super Cup (1): 2013

External links
Player profile on CSKA official website (en)

References

1988 births
Living people
Footballers from Saint Petersburg
Russian footballers
Association football defenders
Russia under-21 international footballers
Russia national football B team footballers
Russia international footballers
PFC Spartak Nalchik players
DYuSSh Smena-Zenit alumni
PFC CSKA Moscow players
FC Nizhny Novgorod (2007) players
FC Mordovia Saransk players
FC Ufa players
FC Kairat players
Russian Premier League players
2017 FIFA Confederations Cup players
Russian expatriate footballers
Expatriate footballers in Kazakhstan
Russian expatriate sportspeople in Kazakhstan